The Throwaways is a 2015 American action film directed by Tony Bui, written by Don Handfield and Michael Ross, and starring Sam Huntington, Katie McGrath, Christian Hillborg, Jack Kesy, Kevin Dillon, and James Caan. It premiered on January 30, 2015, on Crackle.

Plot
When the infamous hacker Drew Reynolds is captured by the CIA, he is faced with a choice. Either to spend his life in jail or work for them. Reynolds agrees to work for the CIA should he be able to form his own squad team called the “Throwaways.” This team was seen as expendable and deemed the worst in the whole organization.

The film opens with lone wolf patriot and black hat hacker Drew Reynolds living in solitude and doing what he does best: hacking anyone he feels is a threat to America and the free world, including various jihadist and other terrorist organizations and militia groups.  His friend in cybersecurity, Erik, alerts him that the CIA has tracked him down and though he manages to briefly elude them, he is captured.  Upon meeting with him, Agents Holden (a former mentor of Drew) and Connelly offer him a deal: spend 30 years to life in prison or work for them to catch an even greater threat. An unidentified hacker has somehow managed to tap into Chicago's power grid using a volatile program known as "Pantheon" and shut it down completely thanks to a special encryption key that allows him access to the entire Internet and World Wide Web and beyond. If this device gets into the wrong hands, the entire world will be at the mercy of any number of terrorists, most likely the highest bidder. Offered a deal where he could forego a possible life sentence if he agrees to use his expertise to locate this hacker, Drew accepts in exchange for total immunity on one condition: he picks the team of experts he will be working with.

Over the reservations of Connelly and Holden, Drew picks three agents who had been deemed as "Throwaways" based on their lack of success or other factors: Dan Fisher, a short tempered and violence-prone ex-agent who's been relegated to basement duty; Gloria Miller, a "swallow" agent who successfully seduces her marks but is nonetheless not taken seriously by her cohorts; and Dmitri Stanislav, a cowardly ex-KGB agent with a history of deserting his comrades (including Fisher at one point) on dangerous missions. As the mission progresses the team are able to learn that the hacker in question is Teebs, a young anarchist who intends to sell the key on the black market to the highest bidder, who ends up being a pro-Soviet Russian defector named Olag Konstantin. It is also revealed that Drew faked the algorithm process by which he chose his team; he simply read their files and selected them based on their shoddy records hoping that the mission would end in failure.  With his immunity deal having already been signed, Drew could then go back to working alone. The others discover this following an assassination attempt on Holden, after which Connelly disbands the team but commends them for proving far more successful than he'd previously thought they would be. Furious, Fisher, Gloria, and Dmitri leave in a huff.

Shortly after, a failed raid to apprehend Teebs's and Konstantin's broker results in Connelly and his team being killed. Drew has Erik pull up everything he can on Teebs while at the same time, Holden identifies one of the assassins who murdered Connelly and his team as Bes, a chameleon agent posing as Teebs's girlfriend who is under Konstantin's employ. Shortly afterward, Teebs reactivates Pantheon at Konstantin's order, causing Bulgaria to experience total blackout. Thanks to Erik's help, Drew is able to locate Teebs and after an apology followed by a rousing pep talk, he and Holden are able to convince their former team members to return and finish the mission.

Once the team is back together, they sneak into Konstantin's headquarters. Drew finds Teebs and tries to convince him to hand over the key. Teebs attacks him instead, but drops the key when Drew shoots him, destroying it and forcing Drew to bypass the hardwired encryption in order to restore Bulgaria's power and prevent a lethal gas valve failure. Gloria, Fisher, and Dmitri take on Konstantin and his men in a lengthy and caper-filled confrontation. Gloria manages to kill Bes while Dmitri and Fisher are able to take out Konstantin and the soldiers with an RPG launcher.

Their mission a success, Drew is made an official CIA agent under Holden's command and is teamed up with the now fully reestablished agents before they eagerly head out on their next mission.  Meanwhile, a post-credits scene shows Teebs retrieving another Pantheon key from a strongbox in an unknown location.

Cast
Sam Huntington as Drew Reynolds
Kevin Dillon as Dan Fisher
Katie McGrath as Gloria Miller
Christian Hillborg as Dmitri Stanislav
James Caan as Lt. Col. Christopher Holden
Jack Kesy as Connelly
Noel Clarke as Erik Williamson
Alfie Stewart as Teebs
Darrell D'Silva as Olag Konstantin
Bashar Rahal as The Broker
Amber Jean Rowan as Bes
Peter Brooke as Agent Langstrom
Atanas Srebrev as Princeton

Production
Principal photography began in September 2014. The film was originally scheduled to premiere on December 19, 2014, but was pushed back due to the Sony Pictures Entertainment hack. The film premiered on January 30, 2015, on Crackle.

References

External links

2015 films
American action films
2015 action films
Films about the Central Intelligence Agency
2010s English-language films
2010s American films